Len Eriksen is a New Zealand rugby league player who represented New Zealand in the 1954 World Cup.

Playing career
A Ponsonby player in the Auckland Rugby League competition. Eriksen was part of the Auckland side who defeated Great Britain 5-4 at Carlaw Park. He was selected for the New Zealand national rugby league team in 1954 and played in three test matches that year, including at the 1954 World Cup.

In 1958 he was part of the Ponsonby side that won the first ever Auckland grand final, defeating Otahuhu 16-7.

References

Living people
New Zealand rugby league players
New Zealand national rugby league team players
Auckland rugby league team players
Ponsonby Ponies players
Rugby league halfbacks
Year of birth missing (living people)